The steppe and forest-steppe of Ukraine and southern Russia is good agricultural land, but it was traditionally held by pastoral nomads. Any state that could drive off the nomads and fill the land with tax-paying peasants would expand its power enormously. During the period 1500–1800, this region was taken under Russian control.

"The history of Russia is the history of a country being colonized....migration and colonization of the country have been fundamental facts of our history.."  Vasily Klyuchevsky, Kurs russkoy istorii, I, 20–21.

In the absence of a good map, locations will be given as approximately so many kilometers directly south of Moscow, and then so many kilometers east or west of that line. Thus, Kyiv is about 600 south and 500 west, while Perekop at the head of the Crimean peninsula is 1100s and 250w. For contrast, France is not quite 1,000 kilometers from north to south and Moscow is about 1,000 kilometers south of the White Sea. Since these numbers are estimates, they should not be cited or copied.

Pre-history

The pre-history of the Eurasia is characterized by a pattern of migration, invasion, melding of population and displacement and this is attributed to its location. Its plains, which are nestled between the Baltic and Black seas, offer a wealth of natural resources and room for expansion, especially with easy access to river routes. This explains the consistent settlement of this region. On the other hand, the location did not offer natural barriers, making the settlements easy prey for invaders.

The Eurasian Steppe first appears in written history about 600 BC with the founding of Greek colonies along the north coast of the Black Sea. These cities traded Greek goods for Scythian grain. The Scythians were replaced as a ruling group by the Sarmatians, Goths, Avars, Petchenegs, Cumans and Khazars. At some point the dominant language changed from the Iranian language of the Scythians to Kipchak Turkic. About 860 A.D. Vikings entered what is now Russia and established trade routes to Persia and Byzantium. They adopted the local language and formed a state (Kievan Rus) which gradually broke up into a set of linked principalities.

There are historical accounts that show how the Kievan Rus was founded by the Scandinavian Varangians in the ninth century. In its early years, the state paid the Khazars tribute but by tenth century, the Kyivan prince Sviatoslav overthrew their rule and ended their empire. He also caused the fall of the Bulgarian empire and conquered numerous East Slavic tribes, the Alans and the Volga Bulgars.

Around 1240 the whole area was conquered by the Mongols. Much of the Slavic population was driven north and west into the forested lands where they were relatively safe from Mongol raiding. As the Mongol Empire broke up, its western part became the Golden Horde with its capital on the lower Volga. These people adopted Islam about 1315. By 1500, the Golden Horde was in the process of breaking up.

The players

The steppe nomads lived on the steppe north of the Black and Caspian Seas and raided north into the forest-steppe. It was their constant raiding that kept the southern lands free of peasants. With the end of the Great Horde in 1502, they were organized as the independent Nogais north of the Caspian and those north of the Black Sea who were more or less subjects of the Crimean Khan.

The Cossacks: Cossacks were the name given to the Slavs who lived on the frontier. They had formed two military polities by around 1500: the Ukrainian Zaparozhian Sich on the Dnieper bend and the Russian Don Cossacks on the Don River bend. There was a reason why these two communities were so remote from the settled lands. Many of the Cossacks on the upper Don had recently fled settled lands and were still within the Russian government's reach. The majority of those on the lower Don had been on the steppe for generations, knew no other way of life, and were out of government reach. The same holds true for the Zaporozhians in Poland.

The Khanate of Crimea: This new Khanate quickly became a vassal or ally of the Turks. The Khan had limited control over his nobles and even less over his Nogai vassals. Crimea could put up to 80,000 horsemen into the field and could conduct large-scale raids into Russia and Poland, especially with Nogai assistance. Many Crimean wars were largely slave raids. The export of captives to Turkey was a major factor in the Crimean economy. For a list of raids see Russo-Crimean Wars.

The Turks: This was a peripheral area for the Ottoman Empire. The Ottomans had some control over Moldavia and Crimea, held a southern strip of the Crimean peninsula including the great slave port of Kaffa, and held a fort at Azov. Turkish armies entered the steppe only twice during our period, although janissaries would sometimes accompany the Crimean Khan. The Turks were important because of their partial control of Crimea, their wars with Poland in the west, their implied threat to Russia if it moved too far south, and because they were the ultimate destination of slaves captured in Russia and Poland.

The Poles: The Poles, who expanded from the west, had a number of disadvantages. The core of the Polish state was in the west and Poland was often distracted by wars with western powers, especially Sweden. Poland was almost an aristocratic republic. Its nobles sought to protect their liberty by weakening the king, which also weakened the Polish army and made a consistent frontier policy difficult. Their main problem was the alienation of the eastern population. The core of Poland was Catholic, but the eastern lands were mostly Orthodox. Society in the Polish core was based on serfdom, but there was greater freedom in the east. Lords with land grants in the east would offer easy terms to attract peasants. Many people in the Polish east were runaway serfs or adventurers who had reason to distrust a strong state. By the 16th century, Polish claims extended east of the Dnieper to a point south of Moscow, although the area was thinly settled and barely administered.

The Russians: In the early 15th century Tsardom of Russia gradually expanded, defeating various khanates in the process. Its autocracy gave it a fairly effective army. Russia also had a conflict between serfdom and frontier liberty, but its political consequences turned out to be less important. Also like Poland, Russia was frequently distracted by unprofitable wars in the west. Brian L. Davis  suggests that Moscow's ultimate advantage was the comparative absence of restraints on its ability to command resources for war.

A Raiding Economy: In addition, the wars recorded in history books, there was a massive amount of petty raiding which kept much of the area depopulated. Raiding and tribute were a major source of goods that could not be produced on the steppe. Crimeans and Nogais raided Russia and Poland. Crimean nobles launched private raids without regard to the Khan. Nogai and Kalmuck clans raided each other. Cossacks raided Crimeans and Nogais, rebelled against Poland and Russia, and hired out for various private and public wars. The Bashkirs were also involved. Capture by Tatar raiders was a constant threat. The market at Kaffa, with its cheap water transport to areas of demand, increased the value of captives. Some were ransomed back to Russia and some were sold east as far as Bukhara. By one estimate  some 150,000 to 200,000 captives were taken from Russia in 1600–1650, but of course there are no exact figures. The numbers for Poland would be comparable.

Forest and Steppe: There was no clear line between steppe and forest, but rather a broad transition zone of forest-steppe. Zones ran from southwest to northeast. The steppe proper began as a narrow band near the Danube. In the east, there were patches of grassland almost as far north as Kazan. Fingers of forest extended south down the river valleys. Slavic settlers preferred the river valleys because of better protection, transportation, firewood, game, and soil (steppe grass can be quite difficult to plow).

1450–1550

The Breakup of the Golden Horde: As the Golden Horde weakened, the more settled areas broke off as follows: 1438: Khanate of Kazan on the upper Volga, 1441: Khanate of Crimea on the Black Sea, 1452: Qasim Khanate on the Oka (a Russian vassal),1466: Astrakhan Khanate on the lower Volga. The steppe remnant became known as the Great Horde.  From 1480 to 1519 Russia and Crimea were allied against the Great Horde and Poland-Lithuania. In 1480 the Great Horde failed in an attempt to invade Muscovy (Great Stand on the Ugra River), a date that is conventionally taken as the end of Tatar rule over Russia. The last Khan of the Great Horde was killed by the Crimeans in 1502. The steppe peoples then became known as the Nogai Horde. The Nogais on the Volga had their own Beg, while those north of the Black Sea were nominally subject to the Crimean Khan. The removal of the Great Horde as a buffer state brought Russia and Crimea into direct confrontation.

Consolidation North of the Oka By 1450 the Grand Duchy of Moscow held most of the land north of the Oka, except for an enclave about 150 km north and west of Moscow. The enclave was annexed: Yaroslavl(1463), Rostov(1474), Tver (1485). Novgorod (300n,300west) was taken in 1470–1480 and Pskov (250n,500w) in 1510. Ryazan (100s,124e) on the Oka fell in 1521. During the Russo-Lithuanian Wars (1492–1522), Moscow took the northeast part of Lithuania, including the Upper Oka Principalities, Smolensk(1514,120s,250w), Novgorod Seversky(1503,400s,400w) and Chernihiv(1503,480s,300w). Thus by 1521 Moscow held all the forested land north of the Oka from its mouth at Nizhny Novgorod (50n,400e) to the Oka bend at Kaluga and west almost to the Gulf of Finland. In addition, there was a bulge west of the Oka down to Chernihiv.

The Bank or Oka Line: The main line of Muscovite defense had always been the crossings of the Oka River. With the removal of the Great Horde as a buffer state, Crimea became the main enemy, and work was begun to strengthen the Oka defenses. By 1533 about 250 km of the bank was extensively fortified, mainly from Kaluga (150s,75w) on the Oka bend to Kolomna (65s,75e). There were weaker fortifications in the west along the Ugra River and east down the Oka to Nizhny Novgorod(400e,75n). In addition, there was an 'out-fort' at Tula (193s) along the main invasion route. From 1522 the military headquarters was at Kolomna. The bank was manned during the spring-to-fall raiding season. Troops were mostly horse archers drawn from the land-owning class, with increasing numbers of artillery and musketeers.

The Abatis Line or Zasechnaya cherta: After 1533 work began on the Abatis Line. From the 1550s troops began mustering on the emerging Abatis Line. This was about 100 km south of the Oka, in two sections. The first ran from the north-flowing part of the Oka south of Kaluga from Peremyshl(160s,75w) or Belyov(225s,75w) roughly along the Upa River to Odoyev (200s,50w), Krapivna (200s,25w), the great fort of Tula(193s), and then past Venyov (150s,33e) to the Oka at Ryazan(125s,125e). The second started southwest of Ryazan and ran from Skopin(founded 1597,200s,100e) through Ryazhsk(1502,233s,150e) and Sapozhok(200s,200e) to Shatsk(1552,200s,250e). The Abatis Line underwent a major reconstruction in 1638 and again in 1659–60. (Note that this account of the course of the Line may not be exact since Davies (see references), who seems to be the only good source, appears to contradict himself in a few places).

From the 1550s there was a line of sorts from Shatsk to Alatyr (1552,150s,550e).

1550–1618: Down the Volga

Down the Volga: There were numerous Russo-Kazan wars, usually involving Moscow and Crimea backing various claimants for the Kazan throne, but Kazan (700e, 25s) was too far away to be dealt with easily. Advanced forts were built at Vasilsursk on the Volga below Nizhny Novgorod (1523: 533e) and Sviyazhsk (1551: 675e, 25s) near Kazan. Kazan was conquered in 1552. In 1554 Moscow installed a Nogai prince on the throne of Astrakhan. When he rebelled, Russia annexed Astrakhan (1556: 700e, 1000s). (This enormous expansion to the southeast presumably depended on river transport down the Volga, but this is not clear from the English sources.) In the First Russo-Turkish War (1568–1570), the Ottomans tried and failed to retake Astrakhan for Islam. Following the Livonian War, intermediate forts were built on the Volga: Samara (1586: 300s, 800e), Saratov (1590: 450s, 500e), Tsaritsyn (Volgograd) (1589: 800s, 400e). Between the Volga and Urals Ufa (350s, 1100e) was founded in 1574.

The Nogai Horde: The independent Nogais on the lower Volga were happy to support whatever regional power suited their immediate interests. Moscow managed them with a mixture of bribes and threats. From the 1530s, some Nogais would ally with Russia, apparently finding more profit in trading than raiding (In 1555 Ismail sent 20,000 horses to Moscow.). Nogai help or indifference was an important factor in the conquest of Kazan. Ismail assisted Russia in the first Astrakhan campaign. This provoked the hostility of Yosuf on the Yaik. Friends of Ismael murdered Yosuf in 1555 and Ismail declared himself Beg of all the Nogais. Yosuf's sons went after him and reduced him to near poverty. This mutual raiding was made worse by a famine. In 1557 Kazy Mirza broke off and established the Lesser Nogai Horde on the Kuban as a Crimean vassal. In 1600 Russia 'appointed' a Nogai Beg for the first time. The Begship disappears from the English sources in 1618. Around 1630 the Kalmyks migrated from Dzungaria and took over most of the Nogai lands on the lower Volga. The remaining Nogais were then nominally Crimean vassals, either north of the Black Sea, or in the Small Nogai Horde on the Kuban.

To Siberia: There was a slow and steady expansion east and north from Kazan into the Kama River lands toward the Urals. In 1582 the Urals were crossed and the conquest of Siberia began. See Siberian River Routes, History of Siberia.

1550–1618: Center

The Livonian War and Time of Troubles: Instead of consolidating his gains in the southeast, Ivan the Terrible turned west (Livonian War 1558–1583). After some initial successes, the war degenerated into a free-for-all among all the Baltic powers.  At war's end, Russia returned, exhausted, to its original frontiers. The strain of this war, Ivan's erratic behavior, and other factors led to the Time of Troubles (1598–1613).  This confusion led to a fair number of people to flee south of the Oka, but, as usual, we have no numbers.

Crimea: In 1556 Moscow, in alliance with Dmytro Vyshnevetsky of the Zaporozhian Cossacks attempted several raids on the Black Sea coast. This policy was abandoned after the start of the Livonian war. In 1571, while troops were away in Livonia, Crimea broke through the Oka Line and burned Moscow (Russo-Crimean War (1571)). This led to a strengthening of southern defenses which blocked the next raid (Battle of Molodi).
 
South of the Abatis Line:With the end of the Livonian War in 1583 attention could be turned to the east and south. New forts were built along and east of Volga (Samara, Saratov, and Tsaritsyn and Ufa). The conquest of Siberia began in 1582. To the south, forts were built along the main Tatar raiding trail at Elets(1592:350s,50e)), Voronezh(1586:450s,100e), Belgorod (1593:575s,75w) and Stary Oskol (1593:490s). These were used as refuges for peasants and livestock during Tatar raids. Sorties from these forts could sometimes deal with smaller war parties and rescue captives. In the far south, Tsarev Borisov(750s) was founded in 1599 and abandoned after 1618. 

Rangers: The practice of sending out long-range patrols appears to have started in the early 16th century at Putivl near the upper Oka. In 1541 a patrol provided enough warning to block a Tatar raid. By 1551 patrols had become a regular practice. A ranger patrol usually consisted of a captain and a few dozen men who covered great distances with no fixed route. When they detected signs of a raiding party they sent messengers back to the nearest garrison. Patrols were made more systematic after the Tatar raid in 1571. A starozha typically consisted of two to six horsemen who operated from a fixed point and systematically surveyed an area with a radius of up to 70 km. Starozha beats interlocked. By 1623 there were 180 of them. The ranger patrols in the south gave early warning while the starozhas detected most penetrations and sent word north to the garrisons and defense lines. The growing number of Cossacks on the upper Don provided an additional source of intelligence.

Colonization: Peasants in the settled lands were generally serfs who could not legally leave their lords, but, given the weakness of police and record-keeping at this time, once a peasant ran away, it was quite difficult to find him and bring him back. Frontier landowners and garrison commanders who needed peasants would often protect any runaways that showed up. Runaways blended into the general class of adventurers, drifters, discharged soldiers, and other unclassifiable who lived along the frontier. Many peasants went only a short way south and remained connected to the economic and political system of the settled lands, while a few went further south into the truly wild lands and became full Cossacks. Moscow vacillated between protecting the interests of its landowners and encouraging frontier settlement. Growing military presence in the south reduced the Tatar threat and increased the number of peasants who were willing to try their luck on the frontier. A proper history of Russia's southward expansion would need a table showing population by region and decade, but such numbers do not seem to be available.

1618–1686: The Belgorod Line

Time of Troubles and Reconstruction: During the Time of Troubles (1598–1613) Moscow lost control of much of the southern area. Various towns were sacked by the Poles, Tatars, and Zaporozhian Cossacks. The Truce of Deulino ended the Russo-Polish War (1605–1618) and Russia lost Smolensk, Seversk, and Chernihiv. During the period of reconstruction (1618–33) the south continued to be neglected. The only significant new fort was Lebedyan.

Smolensk War (1632–34):  During this war, Russia tried and failed to retake Smolensk. Westward diversion of troops led to two major Crimean raids. The one in 1633 was apparently the last to cross the Oka. The war also saw the first use of foreign- formation troops (European mercenary officers and paid soldiers using Dutch-style drill) that were to be important for the next 75 years. At the start of the war, Russia could field about 100,000 men: 27,000 traditional servicemen, 33,000 musketeers, 4,000 artillerymen, 11,000 Cossacks, and about 20,000 Tatar irregulars (up from 35,000 in 1500).

Belgorod Line: After the Smolensk War ended in 1634 and the Tatar raid in 1633, Moscow turned its attention south. The number of frontier troops was more than tripled, to 17,500. The Abatis Line was extensively rebuilt in 1638. Forts located south of the Abatis Line were linked. In 1635-37, eleven new garrison towns were established. Tatar raids in 1644 revealed that fortification was lacking, and eighteen new forts were established by 1653. Frontier deployment was moved south to the Belgorod line beginning in 1646. From 1650, command was based in Belgorod. To attract settlers, standards were relaxed, and many people were granted lands as 'odnodvortsy' (roughly yeomen).

The completed Belgorod Line was shaped like a reversed 'L'. It ran south down the Voronezh River from Kozlov (1635,325s,175e) through Dobryi, Usman (1645), Orlov, Voronezh(1585,450s,100e) and continued down the Don. Where the Don turns east (about 500s) it ran southwest to Ostrogozhsk (1652,525s,75e) then west and slightly south through Userdsk (1637), Novy Oskol (550s,) Ioblonov, Korocha (1638), Belgorod (1596,575s,50w), Kotmyzsk to Okhtyrka(1641, a Polish foundation:600s,150w). Okhtyrka is about 300 km east of Kyiv and 200 km north of the Dnieper bend. The lower Belgorod Line was about 400 km south of the Abatis Line and just north of the Dnieper country then claimed by Poland.

The Don and Voronezh Rivers run down the eastern side, the Donets penetrates at Belgorod and, in the west, the Vorskla River flows south from Okhtyrka through Poltava to the Dnieper. The Belgorod Line encloses a rectangle of about 400 by 300 kilometers. This area contains the central part of the Muravsky Trail Tatar raiding trail and corresponds approximately to the Central Black Earth Region. Inside the rectangle are Lebedyan(1591), Elets(1633), Livny(c1586), Oryol(1566) and Kursk. To the west was Severia and Polish territory. The population inside the line must have grown, but there seem to be no figures.

East of the Belgorod Line: According to the sources, the Belgorod line did not run east-west. Its shape left a 450-kilometer stretch between the Belgorod Line and the Volga forts, and a 600-kilometer stretch from the eastern end of the Abatis Line to the Don Cossacks in the south. This area had a lot of open steppe and roughly corresponded to the 'Nogai Road,' the raiding trail from the lower Volga. Apart from the northern fortifications, there is little information about this area in English secondary sources.

The northern part of this area was fortified at the same time as the Belgorod Line. In 1636 a wall was built east from Kozlov at the north end of the Belgorod Line that effectively blocked the Nogai Road. It was later extended to Tambov (1636:333s,333e). In 1647 work started on a line from Tambov north up the Tsna to Shatsk at the eastern end of the Abatis Line. In 1648–54, the Simbirsk Line was built, which ran from Tambov (1636) through Nizhny Lomov (1636) and Saransk (1641) to Simbirsk (1648, 200s,790e) on the Volga. Part of the Simbirsk Line was later replaced by the Syzran Line which ran from a point east of Nizhny Lomov to the Volga south of Simbirsk. The Trans-Kama Line (1652–57) ran eastward from the Volga at Bely Yar below Simbirsk to Menzelinsk (1586 975e) on a southern tributary of the Kama. Thus Moscow had about 1800 km of the fortified line stretching from Polish territory almost to the Urals.

The Stenka Razin rebellion was mostly confined to the area east of the Belgorod Line and south of Simbirsk.

1648–1709: Ukraine 

Polish-Lithuanian Background: By about 1362 (Battle of Blue Waters) most of northwest Ukraine (including Kyiv) had fallen to Lithuania. In 1385 (Union of Krewo) the crowns of Poland and Lithuania were joined into the Polish-Lithuanian Commonwealth  and Lithuania became Christian, the last European country to do so. In 1569 (Union of Lublin), during the Livonian War, a closer union was made and most of Ukraine was transferred from Lithuania to Poland. In 1596 (Union of Brest) an attempt was made at church union. The Orthodox would retain their rites and married clergy while accepting the doctrinal supremacy of the Pope. Since some Orthodox rejected this, the effect was to create three churches instead of two. From about 1610 the Orthodox and Zaporozhian Cossacks became more closely allied, thereby increasing the alienation of both from Poland. From about 1637 there were rebellions in the eastern lands which led to a movement of population into Russian territory south of the Belgorod Line (Sloboda Ukraine).

Khmelnytsky: In 1648 Bohdan Khmelnytsky started a rebellion which quickly became a general Orthodox rising against Poland, extending as far west as Volhynia. It also became something of a social revolution as landowners, Poles, Catholics, and Jews were driven west. Khmelnytsky sought Russian support, but Russia hesitated, knowing that this would lead to a major war with Poland. In 1654 Russia accepted Khmelnitsky as a vassal(Treaty of Pereyaslav).

Russo-Polish War (1654–1667): Anticipating that the Treaty of Pereyaslavl would mean war with Poland, Russia struck first, taking Smolensk. In 1665 Sweden attacked Poland leading to the near-collapse of the Commonwealth (the so-called 'Deluge'). Instead of finishing off Poland, Russia and Sweden fell out (Russo-Swedish War (1656–1658)), giving the Commonwealth time to recover. By the Treaty of Andrusovo in 1667, Russia acquired Smolensk and Chernihiv and nominal rule over the lands east of the Dnieper, including Kyiv. To the south of this, Zaporizhia was in theory a Russo-Polish condominium, but in practice continued under Cossack self-government.  By the Eternal Peace Treaty of 1686 Poland gave up its claim to Zaporizhia.

The Ruin: After Khmelnytsky's death in 1657, it proved impossible to maintain a Cossack state. The area was effectively divided at the Dnieper from 1660. The partition of Andrusovo was done without Cossack consent. See The Ruin (Ukrainian history). During this period, Doroshenko allied with the Turks, bringing Ottoman armies onto the steppe for the second and last time (Russo-Turkish War (1676–1681)).

Ukraine Partitioned: After 1667 eastern Ukraine was divided into four areas. The Right Bank of the Dnieper gradually returned to Polish control. On the Left Bank was the Cossack Hetmanate under Russian suzerainty. Over the next hundred years, it was slowly converted into a group of normal Russian provinces. To the east of this and south of the Belgorod Line was the Sloboda Ukraine. This area, newly settled by immigrants from further west, retained a Cossack way of life, but Russia never permitted a Cossack political organization. South of the Hetmanate on the Dnieper bend, Zaporizhia was nominally subject to the Hetmanate but was practically self-governing. Over the next century, these areas shared the fate of the Hetmanate.

The Izium Line: From 1680 a triangular area south of the Belgorod Line in the Sloboda Ukraine was fortified. The new line was 530 kilometers long and enclosed 30,000 square km. It pushed the frontier another 160 km southward to within 150 km of the Black Sea coast. From Userdsk west of the southeast corner of the Belgorod Line, it ran southwest to Valuyki(1593,625s,60s) and then south down the Oskol River to its juncture with the Donets (750s) below the old site of Tsarev-Borisov which was apparently reestablished. It then turned northwest up the Donets past Izium, Zmiiv, and Valky to Kolomak(650s,150w) with an extension southwest down the Kolomak River to Poltava. Kolomak is about 60 km southwest of the west end of the Belgorod Line at Okhtyrka. The area inside the line corresponds approximately to Kharkiv Oblast and contains the modern city of Kharkiv which began as a small fort about 1630.

1686–1783: To the Black Sea

The Kalmyks: From about 1630 the Kalmyks (Buddhist Mongols) occupied the lower Volga. They were generally allied with the Russians against their Islamic neighbors and caused the Russians relatively less trouble than the Nogais. With increasing Russian pressure and settlement, in 1771 most of the Kalmyks east of the Volga returned to Dzungaria, leaving remnant south-east of the Volga in and around the present Republic of Kalmykia.

The Russo-Turkish War (1686–1700): After the Turkish failure to take Vienna in 1683, Russia joined Austria, Poland, and Venice in the Holy League (1684) to drive the Turks southward. Russia and Poland signed the Eternal Peace Treaty of 1686. There were three campaigns north of the Black Sea.

Crimean campaigns of 1687 and 1689 Two attempts were made to reach Perekop and bottle up the Crimeans inside their peninsula. They failed because of the difficulty of moving large numbers of men and horses across the steppe.

The Lower Dnieper Forts (1695): From 1694 Peter the Great planned two campaigns using river transport. In 1695 the main Dnieper fort at Kazy-Kermen was taken when a Russian mine accidentally set off its powder magazine.  The lesser forts quickly surrendered, but Kazy-Kermen was too damaged to hold and the main Russian force withdrew up the Dnieper to protect the Left Bank. By the Treaty of Constantinople (1700) the remaining Russian forces were withdrawn and the area south of Zaporizhia became a demilitarized zone.

Azov: From 1471 the Turks had a fortress at Azov at the mouth of the Don. In 1637–42 it was captured and briefly held by the Don Cossacks. In 1695 Peter failed to take the fort because he could not control the river and prevent re-supply. In 1696 he built ships at Voronezh, sailed them down the Don, and captured Azov. He built more ships at Taganrog which were bottled up in the Sea of Azov. After its defeat in the Russo-Turkish War (1710–1711) Russia gave up Azov and its fleet.

The Oleshky Cossacks (1711–1734): Following the battle of Poltava about 20,000 Cossack fled to Ottoman territory and established a Sich at Oleshky across the Dnieper from modern Kherson. Although Turkish subjects, they represented a further southward expansion. By the agreement of Lubni(1744), they returned to Russia and established the New Sich. Oleshky is 100 km north-west of Perekop.

For the push southeast to the area between the Black and Caspian Seas, which began in 1772, see Russian conquest of the Caucasus.

Russo-Turkish War (1735–1739): in 1736 the Russians stormed Perekop and captured Bakhchisarai but withdrew because of plague. In the same year, they took Azov. In 1737 they took Ochakov but gave it up because of the plague. By the Treaty of Nissa Russia was allowed to have a port, but no fort, at Azov.

Russo-Turkish War (1768–1774): Russia sent its Baltic fleet into the Mediterranean and defeated the Turkish fleet. The war ended with the Treaty of Kuchuk-Kainarji. Russia was allowed to use Azov for military purposes. It gained control of the Kerch Strait leading from the Sea of Azov to the Black Sea. It gained Yedisan between the Dnieper and the Bug, including the new port of Kherson (1778). Crimea was to be independent of the Turks, but in fact, became a Russian vassal.

Crimea Annexed: Russia installed Şahin Giray as Khan. His overly firm rule provoked rebellion and he had to be propped up by Russian troops. Crimea was finally annexed in 1783.

Later: Russian expansion to the area north of the Caucasus is not covered in this article. In 1792 the Russian frontier reached the Dniester (Russo-Turkish War (1787–1792). In 1793 the Ukrainian Right Bank was annexed by the Second Partition of Poland. In 1812 the frontier reached the Prut (Russo-Turkish War (1806–1812). The opening of the Black Sea to grain exports contributed to the growth of agriculture and the population in the southern lands. Between the early 19th century and 1860–1890, there was a massive migration of Muslims from the Balkans and southern Russia into Turkey and Persia as a result of the Russo-Persian Wars and the Russo-Turkish Wars of the 19th century precisely. The last areas of open steppe fell to the plow sometime before 1900. In 1944 Stalin exiled the remaining Crimean Tatars to Siberia and Kazakhstan.

Comparative history

In 1978 William Hardy McNeill gave a series of lectures called 'The Great Frontier'  in which he suggested that the expansion of Europe created a worldwide frontier zone that can be studied as a unit. Specifically, he suggested that the Russo-Polish frontier in the east can be studied along with the Trans-Atlantic frontier in the west.

See also
 Foreign policy of the Russian Empire
List of Russian explorers
Territorial evolution of Russia
Russian conquest of Siberia

Footnotes

Further reading
  - which the article mostly summarizes.
  - same thing seen from the nomad side.
 - compares the expansion of Russia, Poland, Austria and Turkey.

Geography, topical maps
 Barnes, Ian. Restless Empire: A Historical Atlas of Russia (2015), copies of historic maps
 Catchpole, Brian. A Map History of Russia (Heinemann Educational Publishers, 1974), new topical maps.
 Channon, John, and Robert Hudson. The Penguin historical atlas of Russia (Viking, 1995), new topical maps.
 Chew, Allen F. An atlas of Russian history: eleven centuries of changing borders (Yale UP, 1970), new topical maps.
Gilbert, Martin. Routledge Atlas of Russian History (4th ed. 2007) excerpt and text search
 Parker, William Henry. An historical geography of Russia (Aldine, 1968).

Tsardom of Russia
Territorial evolution of Russia